The badminton women's team tournament at the 2017 Southeast Asian Games in Kuala Lumpur was held from 23 to 25 August at the Axiata Arena, Kuala Lumpur, Malaysia.

Schedule
All times are Malaysia Standard Time (UTC+08:00)

Results

Quarter-final

Semi-final

Final

See also
Men's team tournament
Individual event

References

Women's team
South